Lake Nipigon Provincial Park is a provincial park located on the east side of Lake Nipigon in Ontario, Canada. In 1999, the park boundary was amended to transfer some land to the Government of Canada for a reserve for the Sand Point First Nation. The park is currently not operating, and there are no visitor facilities.

The park was originally established as Blacksand Provincial Park in July 1960, and was fully operational with 80 campsites in 1961. The park was renamed Lake Nipigon Provincial Park in 1978 to better reflect its geographic location. The campground was closed in 1994, and a portion of park, including the former campground area, was deregulated in 1999 for the establishment of the Sand Point First Nation reserve. Transfer of those lands to the federal government and creation of the reserve was finalized in 2011.

References

External links

Provincial parks of Ontario
Protected areas established in 1960
1960 establishments in Ontario
Parks in Thunder Bay District